Jean Léonard Marie Poiseuille (22 April 1797 – 26 December 1869) was a French physicist and physiologist.

Poiseuille was born in Paris, France, and he died there on 26 December 1869.

Fluid flow
From 1815 to 1816 he studied at the École Polytechnique in Paris. He was trained in physics and mathematics. In 1828 he earned his D.Sc. degree with a dissertation entitled Recherches sur la force du coeur aortique (The force of the aortic heart). He was interested in the flow of human blood in narrow tubes, and invented the U-tube mercury manometer (or hemodynamometer) to measure arterial blood pressures in horses and dogs.

In 1838 he experimentally derived, and in 1840 and 1846 formulated and published, Poiseuille's law (now commonly known as the Hagen–Poiseuille equation, crediting Gotthilf Hagen as well), which applies to laminar flow, that is, non-turbulent flow of liquids through pipes of uniform section, such as blood flow in capillaries and veins. His original formulation for water of 1846 little resembles the present-day formulation and is given as:

However it can be transformed in a more amenable form. Rewritting in more modern fashion using SI units gives:

The term in parentheses, the constant and the temperature correction, are a function of viscosity.

The equation in standard fluid dynamics notation is

or 

or

where:
 is the pressure loss,
 is the length of pipe,
 is the dynamic viscosity,
 is the volumetric flow rate,
 is the radius,
 is the diameter,
 is the mathematical constant π,
 is the average velocity.

The poise, the unit of viscosity in the CGS system, was named after him. Attempts to introduce "poiseuille" as the name of the SI unit Pa·s were unsuccessful.

Notes

References

External links

1799 births
1869 deaths
19th-century French physicians
Fluid dynamicists
French physiologists